Kerf is an outdoor series of two pigmented cast concrete sculptures by Thomas Sayre, installed at the MAX Orange Line's Southeast Tacoma/Johnson Creek station in the southeast Portland, Oregon portion of the Ardenwald-Johnson Creek neighborhood, which straddles the border between Portland (and Multnomah County) and Milwaukie, Oregon (and Clackamas County).

According to TriMet, the pieces were "earth-cast" on site and represent "the influence of wheels on the area, from a 19th-century sawmill on Johnson Creek to the wheels of the MAX train".

See also
 2015 in art

References

External links
 Major public art installations at two future light rail stations by Mary Fetsch (November 22, 2013), TriMet
 Artwork anchors new MAX line to region's history by Jim Redden (April 8, 2014), Portland Tribune
 SE Tacoma St/Johnson Creek Station by Jessica Ridgway (November 11, 2015), How We Roll (TriMet)

2015 establishments in Oregon
2015 sculptures
Concrete sculptures in Oregon
Outdoor sculptures in Portland, Oregon
Sculptures on the MAX Orange Line
Southeast Portland, Oregon